Czerniaków is a district of Warsaw, Poland.

Czerniaków may also refer to:
Czerniaków, Łódź Voivodeship (central Poland)
Adam Czerniaków (1880–1942), Polish–Jewish engineer